Victor Manuel Pozos Segundo (born August 31, 1983, in Santiago Ixcuintla, Nayarit) is a Mexican football player who currently plays for Puebla F.C. in Primera División Mexicana.

Career
He began his career in 2006 playing with the Tecos juvenile squad. Soon after, he was transferred to a second division club Vaqueros Ixtlan where he played from 2007 to 2011, playing in 116 matches and scoring 9 times. In 2011, he was sold to the First Division club Puebla and spent 2011 in the under-20 squad. For the Clausura 2012 he was called up. He made his first division debut after Aldo Polo suffered an injury in mid-February 2012.

External links
 
 Victor Manuel Pozos Segundo at Football-Lineups

1986 births
Living people
Club Puebla players
Liga MX players
Footballers from Nayarit
People from Santiago Ixcuintla
Mexican footballers
Association football defenders

es:Aldo Polo
pl:Aldo Polo